Marie-Andrée Schwindenhammer (9 June 1909 La Neuveville-lès-Raon - 24 May 1981 Chartres), was a French activist for the rights of trans people. In 1965, she founded AMAHO, the first trans association in France.

Life 
Marie-Andrée Schwindenhammer was born Georges Marie André on 9 June 1909, in the small town of La Neuveville-lès-Raon (today merged with Raon-l'Étape) in the Vosges.

After having started to cross-dress during her youth, she had a short married life and then became known after the war under the name of Suzanne Thibault. She was condemned in 1948 for identity theft.

She moved to Paris, where, working for the transvestite cabaret Le Carrousel and managing a permanent hair removal practice, she rubbed shoulders with trans circles and got involved in self-help. In 1965, she founded the AMAHO, Association to help hormonal patients. including Coccinelle. In this way, they provided trans women with cards attesting to their feminine identity which were tolerated by the police, helped with medical and social transition paths, organized spaces for socialization, and carried out several media interventions. She was among the first trans people to request a change of first name at the civil status; she was only partially admitted in 1975.

Her positions were subject to criticism, and the association lost importance over the years, considering trans people as "hormonal patients", whose gender is imposed on them, criticizing transvestites or justifying transsexuality by interference due to injecting growth hormones.

Marie-Andrée Schwindenhammer justified her own transition by claiming to be a victim of Nazi experiences, that she would have undergone at the Natzweiler-Struthof concentration camp, after having been interned as a member of the Resistance. 

She died in 1981 in a car accident.

References 

1981 deaths